Theonoe is a genus of comb-footed spiders that was first described by Eugène Louis Simon in 1881.

Species
 it contains six species:
Theonoe africana Caporiacco, 1947 – Tanzania
Theonoe formivora (Walckenaer, 1841) – France
Theonoe major Denis, 1961 – Spain
Theonoe minutissima (O. Pickard-Cambridge, 1879) (type) – Europe
Theonoe sola Thaler & Steinberger, 1988 – Germany, Austria
Theonoe stridula Crosby, 1906 – USA, Canada

Formerly included:
T. americana Simon, 1897 (Transferred to Thymoites)
T. detriticola Miller, 1970 (Transferred to Carniella)
T. globifera Simon, 1899 (Transferred to Carniella)
T. mihaili (Georgescu, 1989) (Transferred to Carniella)
T. striatipes Petrunkevitch, 1930 (Transferred to Eidmannella)
T. weyersi Brignoli, 1979 (Transferred to Carniella)

Nomen dubium
T. fusca (Blackwall, 1841

See also
 List of Theridiidae species

References

Further reading

Araneomorphae genera
Theridiidae